Traditionally, many distinct types of cheeses have originated from Bosnia and Herzegovina, with as many varieties within each type.

Protected designation of origin
Under the Common Agricultural Policy of the European Union, certain established cheeses are covered by a protected designation of origin (PDO), and other, less stringent, designations of geographical origin for traditional specialities, such as the French appellation d'origine contrôlée (AOC) system, the Italian denominazione di origine controllata (DOC) system, and the Spanish Denominación de origen system.

In Bosnia and Herzegovina the process of protection according to national categorization is currently in progress. For that purpose, among other, the Association of Cheese Producers in Bosnia and Herzegovina (AoCP BiH) was established in 2012, in coordination with Farma BiH, and it gathers cheese producers from all BiH. The members of this state – level association are processing companies, agricultural cooperatives, individual producers and smaller regional associations. Important regional and local subsidiaries are Association of producers of the traditional Livno cheese "Cincar" and "Cincar 2" Agricultural Cooperative. Another organization managing quality and originality control is established, Center for Sack Cheese Maturation, concerned with this particular variety production.

Other cheeses and dairy's products
 Sheepskin sack kajmak
 Kajmak

See also

 Bosnia and Herzegovina cuisine
 List of cheeses
 List of cheesemakers

Notes

External links

 The protection of the Livno cheese and exercising the rights of small-volume producers - WWF 
 Kupres Cheese - UNDP BiH

Cheeses
Sheep's-milk cheeses
Cow's-milk cheeses
Lists of cheeses
Goat's-milk cheeses
Cheeses